Olympique du Kef, is a Tunisian football club, based in the city of El Kef in northwest Tunisia. Founded in 1922, the team plays in red, white and black colors. Their ground is Stade 7 Novembre du Kef, which has a capacity of 15,000.

Games against neighboring clubs Jendouba Sport and Olympique Béja are considered the most important Derbys for Olympique Kef.

Achievements

Performance in national leagues 
 Tunisian Ligue Professionnelle 2: 6
 1958, 1975, 1978, 1987, 1993, 2012

 Tunisian Ligue Professionnelle 3 (Division North) : 1
 2006

Performance in national cup 

 Tunisian Cup: 0
Best performance: Semifinal in 1996

Football clubs in Tunisia
Association football clubs established in 1922
1922 establishments in Tunisia
Sports clubs in Tunisia